The 1954 Spanish Grand Prix was a Formula One motor race held on 24 October 1954 at Pedralbes. It was the ninth and final race in the 1954 World Championship of Drivers. The 80-lap race was won by Ferrari driver Mike Hawthorn after he started from third position. Luigi Musso finished second for the Maserati team and Mercedes driver Juan Manuel Fangio came in third.

Race report 

The long-awaited Lancia D50s arrived-using their 90 degree V8 engine as a stiffening aid for the chassis; they were simple but brilliantly designed. Alberto Ascari immediately set the fastest practice lap and led from pole.

Luigi Villoresi in the fellow Lancia retired with brake trouble after just 1 lap and Ascari succumbed to clutch problems after 9 laps. 

Various other drivers took the lead and then retired; Harry Schell spun off, Maurice Trintignant had mechanical problems and Stirling Moss overheated (one of several retirements caused by flying newspaper jamming the radiator ducts). The race boiled down to a duel between Mike Hawthorn and Juan Manuel Fangio but the Argentine was losing oil and lost second place to Luigi Musso. Hawthorn hung on to take the win with Fangio driving well to claim the final podium position.

This proved to be the last major race held at the Pedralbes street circuit. The Le Mans disaster in 1955 meant tighter safety regulations, and the spectator-lined street circuit in the Pedralbes neighborhood of Barcelona was abandoned and has not been used since.

Classification

Qualifying

Race 

Notes
 – 1 point for fastest lap

Shared drives
Car #22: Toulo de Graffenried (30 laps) and Ottorino Volonterio (27 laps)

Championship standings after the race 
Drivers' Championship standings

Note: Only the top five positions are included. Only the best 5 results counted towards the Championship. Numbers without parentheses are Championship points; numbers in parentheses are total points scored.

References

Spanish Grand Prix
Spanish Grand Prix
1954 in Spanish motorsport
Spanish